Power windows may refer to:

Power window, automobile windows that are raised and lowered by a switch
Power Windows (album), a 1985 album by Canadian progressive rock band Rush
"Power Windows" (song), a 1991 song by Billy Falcon
Power windows is the term for selective color grading in film processing